The following is a list of agencies in the government of Nigeria.

Agriculture 
 Cocoa Research Institute of Nigeria, (CRIN)
 National Agricultural Extension, Research and Liaison Services (NAERLS)
 National Veterinary Research Institute (NVRI)
 Nigerian Agricultural Insurance Corporation (NAIC)
 National Root Crops Research Institute (NCRI)
 Agricultural Research Council of Nigeria
 Nigerian Institute for Oceanography and Marine Research
 Nigerian Institute for Oil Palm Research (NIFOR) 
 Nigeria Agricultural Quarantine Service (NAQS) 
 National Horticultural Research Institute (NIHORT)

Aviation
 Federal Airports Authority of Nigeria (FAAN)
 Nigerian Airspace Management Agency (NAMA)
 Nigerian Civil Aviation Authority (NCAA) 
 Accident Investigation Bureau (AIB) 
 Nigerian Meteorological Agency (NIMET) 
 Nigerian College of Aviation Technology (NCAT)

Communications 
 National Information Technology Development Agency (NITDA)
 Nigeria Communications Satellite Limited (NIGCOMSAT)
 Nigerian Broadcasting Commission (NBC)
 Nigerian Communications Commission (NCC)
 Nigerian Postal Service (NIPOST) 
 National Frequency Management Council
 Nigerian Television Authority
 Galaxy Backbone (GBB)

Economy
 Asset Management Corporation of Nigeria (AMCON)
 Social Security Administration of Nigeria (SSA)
 Budget Office of the Federation (BOF)
 Bureau of Public Enterprises (BPE)
 Bureau of Public Procurement (BPP)
 Central Bank of Nigeria (CBN)
 Corporate Affairs Commission (CAC)
 Debt Management Office (DMO)
 Federal Inland Revenue Service (FIRS)
 Federal Mortgage Bank of Nigeria (FMBN)
 Fiscal Responsibility Commission (FRC) - defunct
 Infrastructure Concession Regulatory Commission (ICRC) 
 National Bureau of Statistics (NBS)
 National Council on Privatisation (NCP)
 National Insurance Commission (NAICOM)
 National Pension Commission (PenCom)
 National Planning Commission (NPC)
 National Sugar Development Council (NSDC)
 Niger Delta Development Commission (NDDC)
 Nigeria Customs Service (NCS)
 Nigeria Deposit Insurance Corporation (NDIC)
 Nigeria Investment Promotion Commission (NIPC)
 Nigerian Export - Import Bank (NEXIM Bank)
 Nigerian Export Promotion Council (NEPC)
 Oil and Gas Free Zones Authority (OGFZA) 
 Nigeria Export Processing Zones Authority (NEPZA)
 Revenue Mobilisation Allocation and Fiscal Commission (RMAFC) 
 Securities and Exchange Commission (SEC)
 Standards Organisation of Nigeria (SON)
 Small and Medium Enterprise Development Agency of Nigeria (SMEDAN)

Education
National Board for Arabic And Islamic Studies (NBAIS)
 Joint Admissions and Matriculation Board (JAMB)
 National Examination Council (NECO)
 National Open University of Nigeria (NOUN)
 National Teachers Institute (NTI)
 National Universities Commission (NUC)
 Teachers Registration Council of Nigeria (TRCN)
National Business and Technical Examinations Board (NABTEB) 
Universal Basic Education Commission (UBEC) 
 West African Examination Council (WAEC) 
National Commission for Colleges of Education (NCCE) 
National Library of Nigeria (NLN)

Energy
 Nigerian Midstream and Downstream Petroleum Regulatory Authority (NMDPRA) 
 Nigerian Upstream Petroleum Regulatory Commission (NUPRC) 
 Electricity Management Services Limited (EMSL)
 Energy Commission of Nigeria (ECN)
 National Power Training Institute of Nigeria (NAPTIN)
 Nigerian Electricity Regulatory Commission (NERC)
 Nigerian Content Monitoring and Development Board (NCMDB)
 Nigerian National Petroleum Corporation (NNPC)
 Nigerian Nuclear Regulatory Authority (NNRA)
 Petroleum Product Pricing Regulatory Agency (PPPRA)
 Power Holding Company of Nigeria (PHCN) - defunct
 Rural Electrification Agency (REA)
 Transmission Company of Nigeria (TCN) lovabletwins13.wixsite.com/mysite

Environment
 Federal Environmental Protection Agency (FEPA) - defunct
 Forestry Research Institute of Nigeria (FRIN)
 National Biosafety Management Agency (NBMA)
 National Environmental Standards and Regulations Enforcement Agency (NESREA)
 National Oil Spill Detection and Response Agency (NOSDRA)
 Environmental Health Officers Registration Council of Nigeria (EHORECON)

Health 
 [National Health Insurance Scheme (NHIS) (www.nhis.gov.ng)
 National Institute for Pharmaceutical Research and Development (NIPRD)
 National Agency for the Control of AIDS (NACA)
 National Agency for Food and Drug Administration and Control (NAFDAC)
 National Primary Health Care Development Agency (NPHCDA)
 Nigerian Institute of Medical Research (NIMR)
Nigeria center for Disease Control (NCDC)
National Drug Law Enforcement Agency (NDLEA)

Intelligence
 Defence Intelligence Agency (DIA)
State Security Service (SSS)
 National Intelligence Agency (NIA)
 Nigerian Financial Intelligence Unit (NFIU)

Judiciary 
 National Judicial Council (NJC)
 Federal Judicial Service Commission (FJSC)
 National Judicial Institute (NJI)

Maritime
 Nigerian Maritime Administration and Safety Agency (NIMASA)
 Nigerian Ports Authority (NPA)
 Nigerian Shippers' Council	(NSC)

Media 
 Broadcasting Organisation of Nigeria (BON)
 News Agency of Nigeria (NAN)
 Nigerian Press Council (NPC)
 Nigerian Television Authority (NTA)

Science and technology
 National Agency For Science and Engineering Infrastructure (NASENI)
 National Biotechnology Development Agency (NABDA)
 National Centre for Remote Sensing, Jos (NCRS)
Sheda Science and Technology Complex (SHESTCO)
 National Office for Technology Acquisition and Promotion (NOTAP)
 National Space Research and Development Agency (NASRDA)
 Nigerian Nuclear Regulatory Authority (NNRA)
 Raw Materials Research and Development Council (RMRDC)
 Nigerian Communications Satellite Ltd (NIGCOMSAT)
National Centre for Technology Management (NACETEM)

Water resources
 Nigeria Hydrological Services Agency (NIHSA)
 Nigerian Integrated Water Resources Commission
 National Water Resources Institute (NWRI)
 River Basin Development Authorities (RBDA's)

Uncategorised 
 Centre for Black and African Arts and Civilization (CBAAC)[]
National Automotive Design and Development Council (NADDC) 
 Code of Conduct Bureau (CCB)
 Computer Professionals Registration Council of Nigeria (CPN)
 Consumer Protection Council (CPC)
 Economic and Financial Crimes Commission (EFCC)
 Federal Character Commission (FCC)
 Federal Housing Authority (FHA)
 Independent Corrupt Practices and Other Related Offences Commission (ICPC)
 Independent National Electoral Commission (INEC)
 Industrial Training Fund (ITF)
 Legal Aid Council of Nigeria (LACoN)
 National Agency for the Prohibition of Trafficking in Persons (NAPTIP)
 National Boundary Commission
 National Council of Arts and Culture (NCAC)
 National Economic Reconstruction Fund (NERFUND)
 National Emergency Management Agency (NEMA)
 National Hajj Commission of Nigeria (NaHCON)
 National Human Rights Commission (NHRC)
 National Identity Management Commission (NIMC)
 National Institute for Hospitality Tourism (NIHOTOUR)
 National Lottery Regulatory Commission
 National Orientation Agency (NOA)
 National Poverty Eradication Programme (NAPEP) - defunct					
 National Salaries, Incomes and Wages Commission (NSIWC)
 National Sports Commission (NSC)
 Nigeria Extractive Industries Transprency Initiative (NEITI)
 Nigeria Immigration Service (NIS)
 Nigerian Building and Road Research Institute (NBRRI)
 Nigeria Institute of Building (NIOB)
 Nigerian Christian Pilgrim Commission (NCPC)
 Nigerian Copyright Commission (NCC)
 Nigerian Tourism Development Corporation (NTDC)
 Public Complaints Commission
 Surveyors Council Of Nigeria
National Lottery Trust Fund

References

 
Nigeria
Government